Dharmendra Kashyap is a member of the Bharatiya Janata Party and he has won the 2014 Indian general elections from the Aonla (Lok Sabha constituency).

References

Living people
India MPs 2014–2019
India MPs 2019–present
1968 births
Politicians from Bareilly
Bharatiya Janata Party politicians from Uttar Pradesh